Dave Washington, Jr. (September 12, 1948 – October 11, 2021) was an American football linebacker who played for five teams in an eleven-year career that lasted from 1970 to 1980 in the National Football League.

Washington played college football at Alcorn State University and was drafted in the ninth round of the 1970 NFL Draft by the Denver Broncos. He was a one time Pro Bowler in 1976.

References

www.davewashington.com

1948 births
2021 deaths
American football linebackers
Denver Broncos players
Buffalo Bills players
San Francisco 49ers players
Detroit Lions players
New Orleans Saints players
National Conference Pro Bowl players
Alcorn State Braves football players
Sportspeople from Tuscaloosa, Alabama